A tux is a type of formal dress.

Tux or TUX may also refer to:

Arts and entertainment
Tux (band), a Hong Kong alternative rock band
Tux, a minor character from Super Mario 64
Tux the Penguin, an animated character from Out of Jimmy's Head

Computing
Tux (mascot), the Linux mascot
TUX web server, an in-kernel Web server for Linux

Places
Tux, Tyrol, Austria
Tumbler Ridge Airport, Canada (by IATA code)

Other uses
MW Tux, a chain of clothing stores
Tux Cattle, an Austrian cattle breed

See also 
Tuck (disambiguation)
Tuxedo (disambiguation)